The 1995 Volvo Women's Open was a women's tennis tournament played on outdoor hard courts in Pattaya in Thailand that was part of Tier IV of the 1995 WTA Tour. It was the fifth edition of the tournament and was held from 13 November through 19 November 1995. First-seeded Barbara Paulus won the singles title.

Finals

Singles

 Barbara Paulus defeated  Jing-Qian Yi 6–4, 6–3
 It was Paulus' 2nd singles title of the year and the 4th of her career.

Doubles

 Jill Hetherington /  Kristine Radford defeated  Kristin Godridge /  Nana Miyagi 2–6, 6–4, 6–3

References

External links
 ITF tournament edition details
 Tournament draws

 
 WTA Tour
 in women's tennis
Tennis, WTA Tour, Volvo Women's Open
Tennis, WTA Tour, Volvo Women's Open

Tennis, WTA Tour, Volvo Women's Open